Homo Sovieticus
Soviet Union